Friedrich Bohndorff (16 August 1848, Plau am See, Mecklenburg-Schwerin - after 1894) was a German researcher and ornithologist.

Initially apprenticed as a goldsmith, Bohndorff embarked on a journey in 1871 to Egypt, where he spent a few years learning Arabic in Cairo. In 1880 he participated on an expedition to the African interior under the leadership of Wilhelm Junker (1840–1892). The expedition was a continuation of scientific exploration and research began by Georg August Schweinfurth (1836–1925) several years earlier. Here, the group entered regions inhabited by the Mangbetu and Azande peoples. In 1882, his northward return on the Nile was delayed by the Mahdi uprising, forcing him to spend more than a year in the Bahr al-Ghazal region in southern Sudan.
 
In 1885–87, with geologist Oskar Lenz, he successfully traversed the African continent from west to east, afterwards spending six months with Lenz in Vienna and Brussels. In 1889 Bohndorff served as a dragoman of the Schutztruppe under Hermann von Wissmann (1853–1905) in German East Africa, and from 1892 lived and worked in Berlin.

In Africa, he discovered and described a number of insect species, as well as ornithological species and subspecies. He has a handful of avian subspecies named after him, including Anthus leucophrys bohndorffi (Congo plain-backed pipit) and Ploceus cucullatus bohndorffi (a village weaver subspecies).

References 
 "This article is based on a translation of an equivalent article at the German Wikipedia".

1848 births
Year of death unknown
People from Plau am See
People from the Grand Duchy of Mecklenburg-Schwerin
German ornithologists
German explorers of Africa